The second season of The Bachelor premiered on 30 July 2014. This season features Blake Garvey, a 31-year-old Perth-based real estate auctioneer, courting 30 women.

Contestants
The season began with 24 contestants. In episode 8, six "intruders" were brought into the competition, bringing the total number of contestants to 30.

Call-out order

	
 The contestant was in possession of the white rose - safe passage through the first two rose ceremonies.
 The contestant received a first impression rose.
 The contestant received a rose during a date
 The contestant received a rose outside the rose ceremony.
 The contestant was eliminated on a date.
 The contestant was eliminated.
 The contestant was eliminated outside the rose ceremony.
 The contestant quit the competition. 
 The contestant won the competition.

Episodes

Episode 1
Original airdate: 30 July 2014

Episode 2
Original airdate: 31 July 2014

Episode 3
Original airdate: 6 August 2014

Episode 4
Original airdate: 7 August 2014

Episode 5
Original airdate: 13 August 2014

Episode 6
Original airdate: 14 August 2014

Episode 7
Original airdate: 20 August 2014

Episode 8
Original airdate 21 August 2014

Episode 9
Original airdate: 27 August 2014

Episode 10
Original airdate: 28 August 2014

Episode 11
Original airdate: 3 September 2014

Episode 12
Original airdate: 4 September 2014

Episode 13
Original airdate: 10 September 2014

Episode 14
Original airdate: 11 September 2014

Episode 15
Original airdate: 17 September 2014

Episode 16
Original airdate: 18 September 2014

Episode 17
Original airdate: 24 September 2014

Episode 18
Original airdate: 25 September 2014

Episode 19
Original airdate: 1 October 2014

Episode 20
Original airdate: 2 October 2014

Ratings

References

Notes

2014 Australian television seasons
Australian (season 02)
Television shows filmed in Australia
Television shows filmed in South Africa